Eurofest '75 was an International Youth Conference and Evangelistic Campaign organised by the Billy Graham Organisation in Brussels, Belgium. It followed on from Spree '73 held in London. The General Secretary for both was Harvey Thomas.

Graham preached from Phillipians teaching on the connections between joy and prayer - two of the book's major themes.  He insisted: "Young people should learn to pray."

The festival took place from 24 July - 2 August 1975, in the Centenary Palace Exhibition Halls whilst the public Campaigns were in the near-by Heysel Stadium, Brussels.

Personnel 
Many well-known evangelical figures first came to prominence at the festival, such as Luis Palau, Bishop Festo Kivengere, Annie Vallotton the French-Swiss Good News Bible illustrator and Manfred Siebald the German singer-songwriter. Vallatton gave a talk each morning before the Bible expositions, that she illustrated on an overhead projector, fitted with an acetate scroll.

Committees

Executive committee 
Chairman: Werner Bürklin (Federal Germany)

Vice-Chairman: Brian Kingsmore (Ireland)

Secretary: Elon Svanell (Sweden)

Richard Bewes (U.K)

Ingulf Diesen (Norway)

Juan Gili (Spain)

Gien Karssen (Netherlands)

Elio Milazzo (Italy)

Richard Møller Petersen (Denmark)

Herbert Müller (Federal Germany)

Jean-Jacques Weiler (France)

Programme Committee 
Chairman: Richard Bewes (U.K.)

Vice-Chairman/Training: Arnold van Heusden (Netherlands)

Vice-Chairman/Music: Svante Widen (Sweden)

Maisie Adamson (Ireland)

Ruth Büchli (Switzerland)

Hermogenes Fernandez (Spain)

Herbert Müller (Federal Germany)

Yves Perrier (France)

Paul Vandenbroeck (Belgium)

Prayer Committee 
Chairlady: Eliana Vuffray (Switzerland)

Moises Gomes (Portugal)

Sheila Stone (U.K.)

Veli-Pekka Toiviainen (Finland)

Dora Winston (Belgium)

Administration 
General Director: John Corts

General Secretary: Harvey Thomas

Full-time co-odinators 
German-speaking Europe: Hans-Jürgen Beulshausen

Iberia: Hermogenes Fernandez

Denmark and Norway: Peter Hofman-Bang

Finland and Sweden: Peo Lannerö

Greece and Italy: Salvatore Loria

Ireland: Cassells Morrell

Netherlands: Bouke Ottow

Great Britain: Tony Stone

French-speaking Europe: Jean-Jacques Weiler

The Co-ordinators were also supported by more than 3,000 district and local voluntary representatives.

Developers 
The morning programmes and materials were developed by:-

Expositors 
Anglican Bishop Festo Kivengere (Uganda) and evangelist Luis Palau (Argentinia & USA) led the Bible expositions. The handbook labelled Palau "Mexico" as he recently had been a Missionary there.

Seminar teams 

Apostolos Bliates (Greece); George Brucks (Netherlands); Alain Burnand (Switzerland); Alain Choiquier (France); Gert Doornenbal (Netherlands); Knut Magne Ellingsen (Norway); Bill Freel (U.K.); Juan Gili (Spain); Charles Guillot (France); Martin Homann (Federal Germany); Tom Houston (U.K.); Brian Kingsmore (N. Ireland); Alfred Kuen (France); Kalevi Lehtinen (Finland); Johannes Lukasse (Belgium); Elio Milazzo (Italy); Yves Perrier (France); Bernhard Rebsch (Federal Germany); Dagfinn Saether (Norway); Anton Schulte (Federal Germany); Hugh Silvester (U.K.); Emmanouel Smpraos (Greece); Theo Sorg (Federal Germany); Don Stephens (Switzerland); Billy Strachan (U.K.); Don Summers (U.K.); Paul Vandenbroeck (Belgium); Virgilio Vangioni (Spain); Jim Wilson (Switzerland).

Music 
The Finnish group Treklangen sang the theme song: "I don't know what you came to do, but I came to praise the Lord" by Dallas Holm. They recorded on the Pilot label in English and Swedish as well as their own language.

One of the special guests was Cliff Richard. He was secured for the conference too late to be mentioned in the hand book. Choralerna, who had featured at Spree '73, performed their gospel oratorio Living Water. The Dutch gospel band 'The Lighters' also gave several performances.

The organisers wanted to cater to all tastes, so they invited a selection of groups and singers from all over Europe.

The resident staff musician was Peter Bye (U.K.) who, with his band and vocal group, led the morning music spots and accompanied the other sessions.

The handbook included the words for 28 songs including one in each of the other six Eurofest languages.

6.	GUD JEG VIL VÆRE KRISTEN (Norwegian)

16.	MIJN VADER, DANK U WEL (Dutch)

17.	OH, JOVENES VENID (Spanish)

20.	QUAND LES MONTAGNES (French)

22.	SIGNOR T'ADORIAMO (Italian)

26.	VERGISS NICHT ZU DANKEN (German)

Languages 
Delegates registered in one of seven official languages. On sign-in they were given a handbook in that language and a colour coded wristband for access to the site. The languages were: English - pink; French - blue; German - yellow; Italian - green;  Dutch - white;  Spanish - orange and Norwegian - violet.

There were seminars in each of the seven Eurofest languages, as well as in Finnish and Greek. Most seminars had a "Teach Team" of two people that shared the teaching.

The meetings were held in the main hall that was divided into eight language areas with wide walkways in between. They were simultaneously translated from English into the other six official languages delivered by overhead speakers in the language areas. English speakers were told to sit anywhere so that their area could be used for on-the-ground simultaneous translation into the additional seminar languages of Finnish and Greek as well as Swedish and other languages.

Minigroups 
All participants were assigned a "minigroup" of 8 - 10 people with a leader to work through each day's Worksheet based on the seminar and pray together. "Minigroup" was the organisers' term for cell group. Some worksheet questions required further subdivision (in half or in partners) to achieve the best group dynamic for the task.

Daily Timetable

+Optional programme 

Options offered for the 14.00 - 18.00 slot included:
 Joining a witnessing team traveling into the city centre
 Joining prayer groups for the witnessing teams
 Special interest seminars (detailed below)

Special interest seminars 

Stott's seminar on leadership was originally intended for "pastors or those interested in full-time service". Graham believed that Stott deserved a wider audience, so he up-graded it to a plenary session that he chaired so that "everyone could be present".

References

External links
 A page of photographs: 
 More photos: 
 Richard Bewes obituary for John Stott, where he tells how Graham changed the programme at Eurofest ′75 to give Stott a larger platform: http://www.richardbewes.com/2014/12/the-blue-riband-evangelical-john-rw.html
 A film in monochrome showing many aspects of the festival (Hungarian commentary): https://www.youtube.com/watch?v=fbqV9WwW3Bs&t=311s
 Pathe film of the event (no audio) showing Treklagen in the Heysel Stadium singing the theme tune: 
 An Assessment of Mass Meetings as a Method of Evangelism: Case Study of Eurofest '75 and the Billy Graham Crusade in Brussels - Google books: 

Evangelical Christian conferences
Religious festivals in Belgium